The Global Challenge (not to be confused with Global Challenge Award) was a round the world yacht race run by Challenge Business, the company started by Sir Chay Blyth in 1989. It was held every four years, and took a fleet of one-design steel yachts, crewed by ordinary men and women who have paid to take part, round Cape Horn and through the Southern Ocean where winds can reach . The fee for the last race proposed (in 2008) was £28,750. It was unique in that the race took the westabout route around the world against prevailing winds and currents – often referred to as the ‘wrong way’ route.

It changed to accommodate different ports of call, but in 2004/5 started from Portsmouth (UK) and stopped at Buenos Aires (ARG), Wellington (NZ), Sydney (AUS), Cape Town (SA), Boston (USA) and La Rochelle (FRA) before returning again to Portsmouth.

The event claimed the motto “The World’s Toughest Yacht Race” and was the ultimate sailing challenge for amateur sailors.  The official charity for the races was Save the Children and the race patron was The Princess Royal.

After failing to secure a title sponsor, the company went into administration on 9 October 2006 placing the future of the race in doubt. The fleet was then put up for sale.

Background
The seeds of the race were sown in Blyth's previous sailing exploits. In 1970/71 he became the first person to sail alone round the world westabout in the yacht British Steel. The practicality of training people who had never sailed before was demonstrated during the 1973/74 Whitbread Around the World race, when Blyth had raced Great Britain II with a crew from the Parachute Regiment. Subsequently, he ran charters for paying crew.

The design philosophy for the identical yachts used on the Global Challenge races was forged by Blyth's longtime associate Andrew Roberts. It was his idea to start from the largest top-action production winch available, which would in turn dictate sail area, displacement and size. He also oversaw the build of the two fleets of steel cutters used in the four races to date to designs by David Thomas and Thanos Condylis (Challenge 67) and Rob Humphreys (Challenge 72).

British Steel Challenge 1992/3

The first race started from Southampton in September 1992 with 10 identical  boats sailed by a skipper and 13 crew. There were a number of serious rigging screw failures in the Southern Ocean and British Steel II , after the initial success of winning the first leg of the race, was dismasted in mid-Southern Ocean, but managed to motorsail safely to Hobart under jury rig. She was re-rigged in time to rejoin the race for the next leg to Cape Town.

The winner of the first race was John Chittenden and crew in Nuclear Electric. Chittenden went on to win the 2001 Yachtsman of the Year Award.

BT Global Challenge 1996/7

An expanded fleet of 14 Challenge 67 yachts set out from Southampton in driving rain and gales. Again rigging problems struck in the Southern Ocean and Concert  was dismasted. Skipper Chris Tibbs and crew made a jury rig and motorsailed to Wellington, New Zealand. Concert  was re-rigged in time to start leg 3 from Wellington to Sydney and was 2nd on the Sydney to Cape Town leg. Yacht Pause to Remember, skippered by Tom O'Connor, suffered a snapped boom halfway between Sydney and Cape Town. There seemed no choice but to fly their trysail until crewmembers Graham Phelp and Matthew Reeves took on the challenge of trying to repair it by using a cut out section as a splint. Two days later a shortened boom emerged from below decks and was successfully attached to the mast.

This race featured an extra leg to Boston and a crew of disabled men and women took part on “Time & Tide”, the first to sail round the world.

Mike Golding dominated, winning five out of six legs in Group 4 with Andy Hindley winning the remaining leg in Save the Children . Three skippers had graduated from being crew volunteers four years earlier: Andy Hindley; Mark Lodge; and Simon Walker, all of whom appeared in the top five placings.  Simon Walker went on to become Managing Director of Challenge Business, helping to organise the 2000/1 and 2004/5 Global Challenges.

BT Global Challenge 2000/1

On 10 September, a new fleet of  steel cutters made their debut in this race. The winner, Conrad Humphreys and crew on LG Flatron, won four of the six legs.

For the first time the race was scored on points, with equal points for each leg, though combined elapsed times are shown here for comparison.

* These teams did not finish all legs, a requirement for a position in the overall standings, but their positions are shown without displacing any other team

Kate Middleton, who married Prince William to become the Duchess of Cambridge, worked as corporate crew during the buildup of the 2000/1 race.

Global Challenge 2004/5

The same fleet of  yachts sailed again in the 2004 race, and the winner was the Australian skipper Andy Forbes and his crew on BG SPIRIT , who won three of the seven legs. Once again, although the overall safety record of the race was very good, medical emergencies did unfold, most notably onboard yachts 'Imagine It. Done.', 'Team Stelmar' (with TWO separate medical evacuations), and 'Save The Children'. In the case of 'Imagine It. Done.', only an extraordinary combined effort of several yachts within the fleet, the doctor onboard (Dr Roche), and the efforts of the Westpac Rescue team saved the life of John Masters. They carried on with 3 crew down crossing the Southern Ocean alone, set the 24-hour record for that leg and finished 11th due to the retirement of 'Imagine It. Done.' Team Stelmar later went on to set the overall 24-hour race record during the penultimate leg of the race between Boston and La Rochelle.

* Retired from leg 2 from Buenos Aires to Wellington (NZ) after a medical emergency on board.

** Stopped racing during leg 2 from Buenos Aires to Wellington (NZ) to render aid after a medical emergency on board to Imagine It. Done.

Specifications of the Challenge 72 one-design

The current 12-strong race fleet of Challenge 72-footers was developed from the Challenge 67s and was specifically designed to be strong, safe and seaworthy in even the worst conditions and to be self-sufficient for long periods at sea, with enough fuel and water to take their crews safely to a distant port. The yachts were also designed to be relatively easy to sail and handled by crews who are not professional.
The yachts have a snakepit, an unusual feature that allows anyone working the halyards to 'hunker down' and shelter in strong wind and rain, and, more importantly, from waves washing over the deck.
Designed by Rob Humphreys, the identical  steel ocean racing yachts were built by Devonport Yachts in the UK by a new method using a unique flat-pack yacht assembly kit of precision cut laser steel panels.

Buyers of the yachts after the demise of Challenge Business

Challenge 72 fleet

Challenge 67 fleet

References

External links

CatZero
Tall Ships Youth Trust
Pangaea Exploration
Polar Bear
Challenge Wales
Big Spirit
Ocean Youth Trust
Website for yacht British Steel
Challenge 67 
Ironbarque
MariFlex Challenge
Sailing-Sclerosis.org

Round-the-world sailing competitions
Yachting races